The   was a Japanese  ocean liner owned by Nippon Yusen Kaisha.  The ship was built in 1899 by Mitsubishi Shipbuilding & Engineering Co. at Nagasaki, Japan.

The ship's name comes in part from the ancient province of Awa.  This turn-of-the-20th-century Awa Maru was the first NYK vessel to bear this name.  A second mid-century, 11,249 ton Awa Maru was completed in 1943.

History
The ship was built by Mitsubishi at Nagasaki on the southern island of Kyushu. The keel was laid down on June 20, 1898.  The Awa Maru was launched on July 27, 1899; and she was completed November 14, 1899.

The ship sailed the route between Japan and England,  By 1914, the ship settled into a regular schedule of sailings between Yokohama and Seattle. and she would be taken out of service in 1930.

On December 27, 1906, the Awa Maru ran aground on the West Scar Rocks off Redcar. There were no deaths, thanks to the efforts of the Redcar lifeboat crew and local fishermen, and after eighteen days the vessel was successfully refloated.

Arguably the most important voyage of this Awa Maru began when it left Yokohama on February 14, 1912, carrying 3,020 cherry trees of twelve varieties.  These fragile tree slips were bound for Seattle where they were trans-shipped across the North American continent via insulated freight cars.  On arrival in Washington, D.C., these trees they would form the genesis of the National Cherry Blossom Festival.

Notes

References
 Ponsonby-Fane, Richard Arthur Brabazon. (1935).  The Nomenclature of the N.Y.K. Fleet. Tokyo : Nippon Yusen Kaisha.  OCLC 27933596
 Tate, E. Mowbray. (1986).  Transpacific steam: the story of steam navigation from the Pacific Coast of North America to the Far East and the Antipodes, 1867-1941. New York: Cornwall Books. ; 
 U.S. Bureau of Manufactures, Bureau of Foreign Commerce. (1905).  Monthly consular and trade reports (1854-1903). Washington, D.C.:  Superintendent of Documents, U.S. Government Printing Office. 

1899 ships
Ships of the NYK Line
Steamships of Japan
Ocean liners